The Brenner Base Tunnel is a  railway tunnel under construction through the base of the Eastern Alps beneath the Brenner Pass. Upon completion, it will be the second or third longest railway tunnel in the world, after the Gotthard Base Tunnel in Switzerland and (depending on their relative completion dates) the Mont d'Ambin Base Tunnel between France and Italy. It will run from near Innsbruck, in Austria, to Franzensfeste, in Italy, replacing part of the current Brenner railway. The line is part of Line 1, the Berlin to Palermo route, of Trans-European Transport Networks (TEN-T).

The Brenner Pass, in the Alps at the border between Austria and Italy, is one of the most important traffic connections between northern and southern Europe, and the motorway going over it is infamous for its frequent traffic jams. Pollution from transit traffic is a major concern because of the combination of temperature inversion with the narrow shape of the valleys leading to the pass.

The goal is to relieve this situation by greatly improving the railway connection between North Tyrol and South Tyrol with the new tunnel, which will allow trains to cross the Alps much faster.

The travel time from Innsbruck to Bolzano will be reduced from current 2 hours to just 50 minutes.

The project is funded by Austria and Italy with large contributions by the European Union. The tunnel is scheduled to be completed in 2032.

Background

The passenger and freight traffic across the Alps has increased greatly in recent years and further growth is forecast. Austria is a key country in movement of freight between northern and southern Europe and between eastern and western Europe. The Brenner region is very politically sensitive with respect to both local and cross-border transport issues. Between 1970 and 1999, highway freight increased seven-fold. (3 million to 22 million tonnes)
In 1990, 70% of the freight from eastern Europe was transported by rail and the remainder by trucks. These proportions were expected to reverse by 2010.
About three-quarters of traffic through the Brenner Pass is currently carried by road transport. Local residents have long fought for relief from the associated pollution.
The construction of a rail tunnel is considered by its proponents to be necessary for a shift of freight traffic from road to rail.

The railway line from Innsbruck to Bozen was built between 1860 and 1867. Tight curve radii and gradients of up to 2.6% complicate rail operations. However, improvements on the Italian side in recent years to the existing line, which were completed in late 2008, allow the line theoretically to accommodate 240 trains per day. The grades were not significantly improved.

The new Brenner line would have a maximum gradient of 0.4%-0.7%. Thus, a locomotive would be capable of hauling more than double the weight. The new line (the base tunnel together with the southern approach from Waidbruck/Ponte Gardena to Franzensfeste/Fortezza) would cut travel time between Innsbruck and Bolzano from about two hours today to less than half that.

Project

Main tunnel
Since under the most recent plan the tunnel starts as a twin-tube tunnel, the junction already prepared in the Inntal tunnel on the Innsbruck bypass will not be used. Instead, a diversion with several branches is planned.

A part of the spoil will be used as fill for the approach lines and another part of the spoil material is used to produce the concrete segment for the final lining of the tunnel. The main tunnels will have a circular cross section with a diameter of approx. .

According to current planning the apex of the tunnel will be at the border at an altitude of about  ASL, although an apex farther south would have been lower. The placing of the apex at the border is set out in the treaty between Austria and Italy. As justification for this choice it is stated that this will allow Austrian water to run in the tunnel to Austria and Italian water to Italy.

Northern approach
On its north end, the base tunnel (BBT) has two entrances, which must go underground a few kilometres before the junction with the main tunnels, and will also be built as part of the BBT. One route leads from the main Innsbruck station under Bergisel and the other connects with the Innsbruck bypass. However, if the Axentunnel extension is added to the Gotthard Base Tunnel, its length would become , allowing it to reclaim the 'longest tunnel' title.

The northern approach from Munich within Germany is the  Grafing–Rosenheim–Kufstein route. The "Brenner Nordzulauf" (Brenner northern link) project aims to construct a high-speed line for speeds of up to 230 km/h (143 mph) between Grafing and Brannenburg in addition to the existing line, adapting the route's capacity to the projected increase as a result of the BBT. The project has reached in-depth planning stages but suffers from lacking support by locals.

In Austria, a new double-track high-speed line supplements the Lower Inn Valley railway between Wörgl and Baumkirchen. It manages to cut travel time between Munich and Innsbruck from 1:50 via the old tracks to merely 0:55 using the high-speed line. About  of the  line through the Lower Inn Valley (Unterinntal) is built underground, in troughs, or under snow sheds. The segment's track superstructure is load class E5. It is capable of handling 260-300 trains per day. This section was opened 
2012-12-09. Planning is under way on the continuation of this line to the German border at Brannenburg.

Planning has been completed for some sections.

History
The Brenner tunnel is the most important link in the Berlin–Palermo railway axis, a series of projects that will create a single railway line from Berlin in Germany to Palermo in Sicily. In April 2003, the governments of Austria and Italy signed an agreement to build the tunnel.

Schedule history
Early in the preliminary planning, at a Brussels meeting in June 2005, BBT SE (Brenner Base Tunnel Societas Europae), presented an interim status report. Expectations following the meeting were that the project could be finalized and the pilot tunnel started by 2006. The target for the tunnel to start service was 2015.

In 2007 a construction timeline with a 2022 finish date was specified in a memorandum signed by the Austrian and Italian ministers of transport.

Funding history
In December 2008 Antonio Tajani, the European commissioner for transport, approved funds totalling €1.7 billion to finance 11 railway projects that together should establish two major routes across the continent.

In May 2009 it was confirmed that final go-ahead for the project had been given.

The final estimated cost was put at €8.384bn at 2018 levels.

Construction history
In the summer of 2007 work started on a pilot tunnel to run along the line of the future tunnel and to be used for removing water and spoil during the major construction phase. Construction of the pilot tunnel between 2006 and 2009 was estimated to cost €430 million and would be 50% EU funded.

Design
There will be a cross over between the tunnels every . Multi-function stations will be located at Trens (in Freienfeld), St. Jodok, and a third station towards the northern end of the tunnel to provide operational and emergency services. ETCS Level 2 will be installed to provide train control.

Funding
As the transalpine stretch of the SCAN-MED Corridor, the Brenner Base Tunnel receives substantial funding from the European Union.
Between 2015 and 2023, 50% of the costs for the exploratory tunnel (about 330 million Euro) and 40% of the costs for the two main tunnels (about 880 million Euro) were covered by the EU. Austria and Italy will each cover half of the remaining costs.

The 2017 estimate of the basic costs for the Brenner Base Tunnel was 7.8 billion Euro. Considering the planned end date for the project (2028), the estimate total costs, with risk provision and adjustment for inflation are about 8.384 billion Euro. They can be divided into 4 large categories: 60% of the cost comes from the engineering works, 15% is for outfitting, 10% is for planning, services and internal costs, 1% for parcels of land and related issues and 14% for risk provision.

Specifications

Source:

Total tunnel length from the Innsbruck bypass to Fortezza/Franzensfeste: 
Length from the Innsbruck portal to the Fortezza/Franzensfeste portal: 
Diameter of each of the single-track tubes: 
Distance between cross passage tunnels: 
Elevation at highest point: 
Maximum overburden: 
Start of construction: 1999 (preparations), 2007 (exploratory section), 2011 (main tunnel)
End of construction: 2032
Total cost: €8.384 billion 
Electrification System: 25 kV 50 Hz AC
Control and command system: ETCS Level 2

See also
NRLA
Austrian Federal Railways
High-speed rail in Italy
Lyon Turin Ferroviaire
Megaproject
Treno Alta Velocità

References

External links

BBT SE (English)
 Tunnel del Brennero: avviati i lavori alla presenza del Presidente Giorgio Napolitano
Brenner Base Tunnel

Base tunnels
High-speed railway lines in Austria
High-speed railway lines in Italy
Proposed public transport in Austria
Proposed railway tunnels in Europe
Railway tunnels in Austria
Railway tunnels in Italy
Transport in South Tyrol

2032 in rail transport